Infante Francisco, Duke of Beja, (Lisbon, 25 May 1691 – Lisbon, 21 July 1742) was a Portuguese infante (prince) son of Peter II, King of Portugal, and his second wife, Maria Sofia of the Palatinate.

Early life 

Francisco Xavier José António Bento Urbano was born on 25 May 1691 in Lisbon. He was given the Duchy of Beja and was made Grand-Prior of Crato and Lord of the Infantado. Plans for him to marry Archduchess Maria Magdalena of Austria sister of Queen Maria Anna failed in the early stages.

Career 
Responding to a request by Pope Clement XI to aid in the fight against the Turks, in 1716, King John V of Portugal (Infante Francisco's brother) sent an armada of Portuguese ships to aid Venice and Austria in their fights against the Turks, led by the Duke of Beja, and Lopo Furtado de Mendonça, Count of Rio Grande.

Affairs and issue 
He died unmarried and without legitimate issue (in spite of two illegitimate children from Mariana da Silveira) on 21 July 1742 at the Quinta das Gaeiras in Óbidos. He is buried at the Royal Pantheon of the Braganza Dynasty in Lisbon.

He had two natural children with Mariana Silveira, a nun, who died during the 1755 Lisbon earthquake:

 Pedro of Braganza (¿? – 1741)
 João da Bemposta (1725–1780) Captain General of the Portuguese Navy and Chief Steward of the Royal Household. Married Maria Margarida de Lorena, 2nd Duchess of Abrantes.

Ancestry

References

Bibliography 
 

1691 births
1742 deaths
People from Lisbon
Portuguese infantes
107
Burials at the Monastery of São Vicente de Fora
House of Braganza
17th-century Portuguese people
18th-century Portuguese people
Constables of Portugal
Sons of kings